Marcelle Aimée Léonie Laloë (Algiers, July 2, 1884 - Château de Losse, Thonac, Dordogne, September 5, 1974) was a French woman who was the wife of Emperor Hàm Nghi of the Nguyễn dynasty of Vietnam. She was the daughter of Francis Laloë, President of the Appeal Court of Algiers, and Suzanne Ving. On November 4, 1904, she married Emperor Ham Nghi of Vietnam in Algiers, at the Cathedral of St Philip. Rebel to the French, her husband was captured in November 1888 and sent in exile to Algiers, where he arrived with a small retinue on 13 January 1889. They first lived in a rented villa and then purchased the Villa des Pins in El Biar, an affluent district of the capital 4-kilometer from the town center.

They had three children, Prince Minh-Duc, Princess Nhu May and Princess Nhu Lý. She is buried in the cemetery of Thonac, near her husband.

1884 births
1974 deaths
Nguyen dynasty
French people in French Algeria